Nipissing East was a provincial electoral district in the Canadian province of Ontario, active from 1902 to 1908.

Due to population growth, the district of Nipissing was divided into Nipissing East and Nipissing West for the 1902 election. By 1908, however, population changes in Nipissing West led to that district being divided into the new districts of Sudbury and Sturgeon Falls, and Nipissing East was dissolved back into the Nipissing district.

Members of Provincial Parliament

References

Former provincial electoral districts of Ontario